Duryea may refer to:

Duryea (surname)
Duryea Motor Wagon Company, first American automobile company
Duryea, Pennsylvania, a borough in Luzerne County